William Rousseau is a French singer and composer.

Biography 
William Rousseau moved to Paris in 2002 and signed as a composer for Warner. He wrote songs for Celine Dion,  Tina Arena, Nolwenn Leroy, Roch Voisine, Anggun, Chimène Badi, and Christophe Willem amongst others.

In 2005, along with Dove Attia and friend Rod Janois, he contributed two songs for the musical Le Roi Soleil. His next project is with the team of composers for Mozart, l'opéra rock (2009), 1789 : Les Amants de la Bastille (2012); Mistinguett, reine des années folles (2014) and Le Rouge et Le Noir (2016).

In 2009, he released his first solo album: Ton homme en passant, with Jérôme Attal's lyrics.

In 2012, with Jean-Pierre Pilot, he wrote Echo (You and I) for Anggun, the French candidate at the Eurovision Song Contest. He also produced Always with Jean-Pierre Pilot, and Elles & Lui for Alain Chamfort with Olivier Schultheis .

Discography

Album 
 2009 : Ton homme en passant

Singles 
 2008 : Comme un soviet
 2009 : La fête des loges

Contributions 
 2004 : A tes côtés, Se laisser quelque chose, Maintenant - David Charvet
 2005 : Mystères - Nolwenn Leroy
 2005 : Tant qu'on rêve encore, Contre ceux d'en-haut for Le Roi Soleil
 2005 : Ne plus aimer - Roch Voisine
 2006 : Le miroir - Chimène Badi
 2006 : Je suis - Florent Pagny
 2006 : Rien ni personne, Plus que jamais - Emmanuel Moire
 2009 : Berlin - Christophe Willem
 2009 : Tatoue-moi,  L'assasymphonie and other songs Mozart, l'opéra rock
 2010 : C'est le soir que je pense à ma vie - Florent Pagny
 2010 : Dans un vertige de Marie-Amélie Seigner
 2011 : Cool - Christophe Willem
 2011 : Je crois en tout, Je partirai, Mon meilleur amour, Mon coeur, J'ai appris le silence - Anggun
 2011 : Il marche - Amel Bent
 2012 : Pour la peine and other songs for 1789 : Les Amants de la Bastille
 2012 : Les jours comme ça - Céline Dion
 2012 : Echo (You and I) - Anggun
 2012 : Elles & Lui - Alain Chamfort
 2013 : Louise - Benjamin Bohem
 2013 : C'est la vie - Lussi in the sky and his Nebula
 2014 : C'est mon homme and other songs for Mistinguett, reine des années folles
 2016 : Le Rouge et le Noir
 2017 : Trace ton chemin - Nolwenn Leroy
 2018 : Ok ou Ko - Emmy Liyana
 2018 : My World - Lucie Vagenheim
 2019 : T'aimer de trop - Amel Bent

Awards 
 NRJ Music Award 2010 : French song of the year for L'Assasymphonie

References

External links 
Official site 

French male singers
French composers
French male composers
Living people
Year of birth missing (living people)